Serpent Mound crater, also known as the Serpent Mound Disturbance, is an eroded meteorite impact crater in Ohio, United States. It lies largely in Adams County, with the northern part mostly in Highland County, except for a small northeast part in Pike County.

It is classified as a complex crater because it features a central uplift, a transition zone, and a ring graben (a ring-shaped trough in the outer part of the crater).

The crater is named after the Serpent Mound, an effigy mound, located on a plateau in Brush Creek Valley within the crater. European-American explorers had already noted the unusual terrain in the 19th century, and it is often speculated that the odd geological features inspired Native Americans to construct the mound at that location.

In 1980, the Serpent Mound Cryptoexplosive Structure was designated as a National Natural Landmark by the National Park Service.

References

Carboniferous impact craters
Impact craters of the United States
Landforms of Ohio
Landforms of Adams County, Ohio
Landforms of Highland County, Ohio
Landforms of Pike County, Ohio
National Natural Landmarks in Ohio